Zdeněk Rudolph "Zee" Marek (October 15, 1925 – March 29, 2019) was a Czechoslovakia-born American ice hockey center who won a gold medal at the 1949 Ice Hockey World Championships before defecting to the United States.

Career
Marek was a rising star for Czechoslovakia after World War II, playing for his local team as well as HC Sparta Praha. After the Czech national team lost six players to a plane crash in November 1948, he was selected for the team's appearance at the 1949 Ice Hockey World Championships. The Czech team was looking to repeat it's gold medal from 1947 and rebound from losing the silver to Canada at the 1948 Winter Olympics. Marek only played in 2 games, scoring one goal, but the team was able to win the gold with an unbeaten record.

During the tournament Marek had befriended two American players, Buzz Johnson and his brother Milt, and had told them that he didn't want to return home because he was not a member of the Communist Party and feared what would happen to him in the future. The brothers, who both attended the University of North Dakota agreed to help him apply for a student visa with their alma mater so he could defect to the United States. After the tournament Marek hid in Stockholm and awaited news of the plan. During his stay in Sweden he appeared briefly for Hammarby. In July 1949 North Dakota not only agreed to admit Marek, but provided him with a free scholarship as well. This allowed Marek to travel to the US on a student visa and began attending school that fall.

There was one problem, however; because the immigrant quota from Czechoslovakia had already been reached and surpassed, Marek did not automatically qualify for resident status in the US. Because his initial filings with the INS lacked sufficient reason to grant Marek's case special circumstances, according to then-Deputy Attorney General Peyton Ford, the initial recommendation was to deny Marek a visa. Despite this recommendation, the US Senate passed bill S. 178 on May 28, 1951 to grant permanent resident status to Marek upon receipt of a head tax and visa fee.

At that time Marek had completed his sophomore season for North Dakota and had taken to being called "Stan" rather than Zdeněk. After becoming a permanent resident, Marek never again played organized hockey but he did remain at North Dakota to earn his degree. After graduating, Marek moved to New York and began designing women's dresses. He eventually founded his own label, Marek Inc., and served as a private designer for department stores on Fifth Avenue. Though he left hockey in his past, Marek remained an avid athlete into his retirement, winning the New York State Tennis championship for 75+ men in 2001. 

Marek died of natural causes near his long-time home of Phoenicia, New York in 2019.

Statistics

Regular season and playoffs

International

References

External links
 

1925 births
2019 deaths
American men's ice hockey centers
Czech ice hockey centres
Sportspeople from Prostějov
HC Sparta Praha players
Hammarby Hockey (1921–2008) players
North Dakota Fighting Hawks men's ice hockey players
Czechoslovak emigrants to the United States
Czechoslovak ice hockey centres
Czechoslovak defectors
Czechoslovak expatriate sportspeople in Sweden